Jericho Creek is a tributary of Telegraph Creek in Powell County, Montana.

References

Rivers of Montana